Paceyodon is an extinct genus of morganucodontan from Early Jurassic deposits of southern Wales, United Kingdom. Paceyodon is known from an isolated molariform that is significantly larger than any morganucodontan molariform yet discovered. It was collected in the Pant Quarry, Vale of Glamorgan. It was first named by William A. Clemens in 2011 and the type species is Paceyodon davidi.

References 

Morganucodonts
Hettangian life
Jurassic synapsids of Europe
Jurassic Wales
Fossils of Wales
Fossil taxa described in 2011
Taxa named by William A. Clemens Jr.
Prehistoric cynodont genera

Paleontology in Wales